Nichola Joan Turner (born 25 December 1959) is a New Zealand former cricketer who played as a right-handed batter. She appeared in 6Test matches (Test Cap 82) and 28 One Day Internationals for New Zealand between 1982 and 1991. She played domestic cricket for Canterbury and Auckland.

She coached the New Zealand Under 23 team in an Internal series and in a match against a Touring England Team in 1992.English women's cricket team in Australia and New Zealand in 1991–92#3-day match: New Zealand Under-23s v England{http://static.espncricinfo.com/db/ARCHIVE/1991-92/OTHERS+ICC/ENG-WOMEN_IN_NZ/ENG-WOMEN_NZ-U23-WOMEN_01-03FEB1992.html|date=June 2021}}

Having previously held cricket's highest coaching qualification (MCC), when New Zealand Cricket altered its qualifications to bring in a Tier 3 qualification system, Turner was the first woman to receive the highest qualification and was amongst the first (of men and women) to receive it.

In 1993, she applied for the role of Head Coach of the Auckland Aces (Mens cricket), losing out to John Bracewell despite holding the same level 3 qualification and having more experience as a coach of male cricketers. A controversy erupted, most notably with Gavin Larsen and Adam Parore stating they had concerns about a woman in their changing room and how could a woman, who has never faced the fastest bowler, tell him anything about how to bat.

Turner commentated the Black Caps matches against England (Test series) and ODIs versus Zimbabwe for TVNZ in the 1996/1997 season.

In 1997, Turner joined the Board of Coaching New Zealand and served as its president until it was merged into SPARC.

In 2007, Turner became a board member of SPARC (now SportNZ) serving a three-year term during which, on behalf of SPARC, she launched 'the Active Communities Strategy which aims to encourage people to live healthy lifestyles and increase participation in, and strengthen the delivery of, sport and recreation in Hamilton'.

References

External links

1959 births
Living people
Cricketers from Christchurch
New Zealand women cricketers
New Zealand women Test cricketers
New Zealand women One Day International cricketers
Canterbury Magicians cricketers
Auckland Hearts cricketers